The 1963–64 Yugoslav First League season was the 18th season of the First Federal League, the top level football league of SFR Yugoslavia, since its establishment in 1946. Fourteen teams contested the competition, with Red Star winning their 7th title.

Teams 
At the end of the previous season Sloboda and Budućnost were relegated. They were replaced by Vardar and Trešnjevka.

League table

Results

Top scorers

The Planinić Affair
In August 1965, at the beginning of the 1965-66 season—fourteen months after the end of the 1963-64 season when the alleged transgressions had taken place—FK Željezničar goalkeeper Ranko Planinić came forward with information alleging match-fixing. He claimed that towards the end of the season his club threw its league matches against Hajduk Split and NK Trešnjevka in exchange for monetary payouts, which the two relegation-threatened teams decided to pay in order to help themselves avoid the drop to the Yugoslav Second League. Specifically, Planinić claimed that the match played on 31 May 1964 in Split—Hajduk's 4-0 win over Željezničar—was fixed, as well as the following week's match on 7 June 1964 in Sarajevo that saw Željezničar and visiting Trešnjevka play to a 3-3 draw. He was in Željezničar's goal in both matches. 

Planinić made the information public in August 1965, fourteen months after the fact, by approaching a Večernje novine journalist Alija Resulović who in turn took Planinić's testimony in form of an interview that was published by the paper with circulation of 100,000 copies at the time. In his 2006 book Ona vremena, Resulović claims to have contacted FK Željezničar's president Nusret Mahić right before submitting the piece for publishing, informing him of Planinić's allegations, seeking comment, and even offering to sit on the information if he (Mahić) thinks it necessary. Resulović further claims that Mahić's response was: "Publish it all! It's all a lie that Planinić concocted as revenge after being fined for a training session incident he had caused".

The explosive testimony erupted in a nationwide scandal that would become known as the 'Planinić Affair'. In the years prior, on multiple occasions, Yugoslav First League had been plagued by rumours of widespread match-fixing, however, this was the first instance of a player coming forward as whistleblower and substantiating those claims on the record.

Investigation
Right after Planinić's allegations hit the press, the Yugoslav FA (FSJ) disciplinary body (disciplinski sud) began an investigation into the two matches Planinić claimed were fixed. Its findings were summarized in an internal memo that was later obtained by various Yugoslav press outlets:

NK Hajduk Split vs. FK Željezničar Sarajevo played on Sunday, 31 May 1964

Punishment
On 27 August 1965, the Yugoslav FA's disciplinary body (disciplinski sud) presided over by Svetozar Savić handed out the following penalties:
FK Željezničar's board members, including club president Nusret Mahić, got lifelong bans on performing any football-related official functions.
FK Željezničar's head coach at the time Vlatko Konjevod got a lifetime ban from football.
FK Željezničar's players Ivica Osim and Mišo Smajlović each got a one-year ban from football.
NK Hajduk Split's board members, including club president Josip Košto, got lifelong bans on performing any football-related official functions.
NK Hajduk Split's head coach at the time Milovan Ćirić got a lifetime ban from football.
Two members of NK Trešnjevka's board got lifelong bans on performing any football-related official functions.
NK Trešnjevka's club president Ivan Bačun and technical director Marjan Matančić got disciplinary motions started against them.
NK Dinamo Zagreb's general secretary Oto Hofman got a lifetime ban from football for acting as a go-between for Željezničar and Trešnjevka.

Disciplinary body president Svetozar Savić also announced that the investigation had revealed that Željezničar was paid YUD1.5 million by Hajduk Split, and YUD4 million by Trešnjevka for these matches. Some of the money Trešnjevka paid was obtained from the Zagreb Fair where some of Trešnjevka's board members were employed at. As a reference point, the price of a daily newspaper at the time was YUD40.

Appeals
On appeal, the main punishment for the three clubs was reduced to points-deduction. For the 1965-66 season, Željezničar, Hajduk, and Trešnjevka were docked 6, 5, and 5 points, respectively.

See also 
 1963–64 Yugoslav Second League
 1963–64 Yugoslav Cup

References

External links 
 Yugoslavia Domestic Football Full Tables

Yugoslav First League seasons
Yugo
1963–64 in Yugoslav football